The 2020–21 Società Polisportiva Ars et Labor season was the club's 114th season in existence and the club's first season back in the second division of Italian football. In addition to the domestic league, SPAL participated in this season's edition of the Coppa Italia. The season covers the period from 3 August 2020 to 30 June 2021.

Players

First-team squad

Out on loan

Transfers

Pre-season and friendlies

Competitions

Overview

Serie B

Results summary

Results by round

Matches
The league fixtures were announced on 9 September 2020.

Coppa Italia

Statistics

Appearances and goals

|-
! colspan=14 style=background:#dcdcdc; text-align:center| Goalkeepers

|-
! colspan=14 style=background:#dcdcdc; text-align:center| Defenders

|-
! colspan=14 style=background:#dcdcdc; text-align:center| Midfielders

|-
! colspan=14 style=background:#dcdcdc; text-align:center| Forwards

|-
! colspan=14 style=background:#dcdcdc; text-align:center| Players transferred out during the season

Goalscorers

References

External links

S.P.A.L. seasons
S.P.A.L.